Archery at the 1987 Pan American Games was held in August 1987. The events took place at a temporary site at Eagle Creek Park in Indianapolis, United States. Just like in the Olympics, the archery competition will be held using the recurve bow.

Medal summary

Medal table

Events

See also
Archery at the 1988 Summer Olympics

References 

P
Events at the 1987 Pan American Games
1987